The Art of War is the third studio album by hip hop group Bone Thugs-N-Harmony which was released on July 29, 1997. The album sold 394,000 units in its first week of release.  The album was certified quadruple Platinum by the RIAA in June 1998. It was the first double-album from Bone Thugs-n-Harmony. The album included the platinum-single "Look into My Eyes", and the gold-single "If I Could Teach the World".  The whole album is produced by DJ U-Neek.

A sequel to the album The Art of War: World War III was released on December 10, 2013.

Background
The album was rumored to be called "DNA Level C" which is Cleveland backwards.  "The Art of War" was created largely as a response to rappers deemed "Clones" (copycats) by the group. Such rappers included Do or Die, Crucial Conflict, Twista & The Speedknots & Three 6 Mafia.

In the wake of his father's death and Tomica Wright now heading Ruthless, Bizzy Bone was not happy, and thus did not appear for many shows or promotions. Now calling the shots, many tracks were altered by Tomica Wright, attempting to head the group into a new direction. Such tracks include Thug Luv with Sylk-E. Fyne, If I Could Teach the World, Friends, Ready For War and many others. While the group appeared at Sprite Nite on BET, Keenan Ivory Wayans (with Bizzy), and several other promotions, their tour began to lag without Bizzy.

Music and lyrics
In "Ready 4 War," Bone Thugs-n-Harmony (along with Mr. Majesty) called out Crucial Conflict directly by name, with Majesty even stating, "I'll watch you ride the rodeo straight to the bottom". The tracks "Handle The Vibe," "Look Into My Eyes," "Body Rott," "Ready 4 War," "Hatin' Nation," Wasteland Warriors," "All Original," "Whom Die They Lie" and "U Ain't Bone" can all be considered as diss tracks. 

In "U Ain't Bone", Layzie Bone raps a line similar to the chorus from female rap icon MC Lyte's 10% Dis. MC Lyte's chorus raps "Beat biter! Dope style taker! Tell it to your face, you ain't nuttin but a faker!", while Layzie Bone's verse interpolates "They beat biters, dope-style takers. When I see you face-to-face, my nigga, I'm-a treat you like a hater." In 2000, MC Lyte stated that she was "extremely" disrespected by Layzie Bone, Lil' Kim and Foxy Brown's lyrical interpolations of her "10% Dis" lines. Layzie interpolated the chorus on "U Ain't Bone", while Kim and Brown interpolated the beginning verse, "Hot damn, ho, here we go again!" on Mobb Deep's "Quiet Storm" (Remix) and Capone-N-Noreaga's "Bang-Bang", respectively. This resulted in MC Lyte calling out all of the three rappers on the Rah Digga-collaborated, "Where U At Mama?"

They also changed the name of "Friends" for the cassette version to "How Many of Us Have Them". 2Pac wrote his verse for "Thug Luv" in 1 minute and 51 seconds as confirmed by Bizzy Bone.

Singles
The first single for this album was Look Into My Eyes, which was also on the Batman & Robin soundtrack. Neither Bizzy nor Flesh-n-Bone was featured in the video. The next single was "If I Could Teach the World". Bizzy did not appear in this video either. "Thug Luv" and "Body Rott" were also released to radio as singles.

Critical reception

The Art of War received mostly positive reviews from music critics, with some critics calling the album sonically superior to its predecessor, E. 1999 Eternal. While others criticizing the album for its length, including extended disses towards other rappers, leading to repetitive song play. Stephen Thomas Erlewine of Allmusic said, "While the group is capable of producing a catchy single, they don't have the personality to sustain an album, much less a double-disc set. By the end of the second disc, they have repeated all of their ideas at least five times apiece, and only a few of those ideas resulted in actual songs in the first place." J.D. Considine of Entertainment Weekly gave the album a "B" rating, stating, "Lest the smooth sound of 'Look Into My Eyes' leaves you thinking the Bone Thugs-N-Harmony are really just pop-friendly softies, this 28-song double disc, The Art of War, offsets its slow-and-sweet numbers with bloodthirsty workouts like the shotgun-spiked 'Thug Luv'. But after two hours of these singsong melodies, War seems more like a siege than a surgical strike." Rolling Stone gave the album three and a half stars out of a possible five. Krayzie Bone said in a 2015 interview with HipHopDX that The Art of War was Bone Thugs-N-Harmony's best album, even better than E. 1999 Eternal. Comparing to Eternal, whose songs he claimed were planned and written years before they were recorded, where in contrast The Art of War consisted entirely of newer material that he and the other group members had sat in the studio to create. The response to these statements from mainstream media and fans has been evenly divided. Rapper Wiz Khalifa included the album in his list of "25 Favorite Albums" for Complex.

Track listing
All tracks produced by DJ U-Neek

Sample credits
World War 1
"Handle the Vibe" contains a sample of "Love's Gonna Get'cha (Material Love)" as performed by Boogie Down Productions
"It's All Mo' Thug" contains a sample of "Don't Let Me Be Lonely Tonight" as performed by Isaac Hayes
"Ready 4 War" contains a sample of "Love Hangover" as performed by Diana Ross
"Ain't Nothin Changed (Everyday Thang Part 2)" contains a sample of "Have You Ever Loved Somebody" as performed by Freddie Jackson
"Hard Times" contains a sample of "Love.... Can Be So Wonderful" as performed by The Temprees
"Mind of a Souljah" contains a sample of "Promise Me" as performed by Luther Vandross

World War 2
"Hatin' Nation" contains a sample of "Juicy Fruit" as performed by Mtume
"Blaze It" contains a sample of "Why Have I Lost You" as performed by Cameo
"Evil Paradise" contains a sample of "White Horse" as performed by Laid Back
"Thug Luv" contains a sample of "Friday the 13th Original Theme" by Harry Manfredini
"U Ain't Bone" contains a sample of "Ring the Alarm" as performed by Tenor Saw
"Friends" contains a sample of "Friends" as performed by Whodini

Appearances
 Krayzie Bone appears on 25 tracks.
 Layzie Bone appears on 22 tracks.
 Bizzy Bone appears on 18 tracks.
 Wish Bone appears on 15 tracks.
 Flesh-n-Bone appears on 6 tracks.

The vinyl release omits the tracks 1, 6 and 12 on WW2.

Charts

Weekly charts

Year-end charts

Certifications

See also
List of number-one albums of 1997 (U.S.)
List of number-one R&B albums of 1997 (U.S.)

References

External links
 [ allmusic.com]

Ruthless Records albums
Bone Thugs-n-Harmony albums
1997 albums
G-funk albums